Birnbaumins are a pair of alkaloids and toxic yellow pigment compounds first isolated from the flowerpot parasol mushroom.  These toxins can cause gastric ulcers if consumed.

References

Tryptamine alkaloids
Mycotoxins found in Basidiomycota
Amidines
Oximes
Hydroxylamines
Biological pigments
Conjugated ketones
Amides